BVC '12 is a football club from Beek, Netherlands. BVC '12 plays in the 2017–18 Sunday Hoofdklasse B..

References

External links
 Official site

Football clubs in the Netherlands
Football clubs in Berg en Dal (municipality)
Association football clubs established in 1912
1912 establishments in the Netherlands